The Berkeley Piano Club was founded in 1893 by Berkeley women. In 1912 the club built a clubhouse designed by William L. Woollett with an internationally known performance space. It was designated a city historical landmark in 2005. The designation also includes the house, final home of John Galen Howard (his wife was club president from 1911-1913), in an upstairs workshop of which a trigger was designed for the atomic bomb by a Manhattan Project scientist. The landmark designation made the property eligible for state funding and a restoration was also completed in 2005.

Nicolas Slonimsky lectured at the clubhouse in 1971.

The club published a history for its centennial, The Berkeley Piano Club: One Hundred Years of Harmony
by Mary F. Commanday.

References

Buildings and structures in Berkeley, California